A bland diet is a diet consisting of foods that are generally soft, low in dietary fiber, cooked rather than raw, and not spicy. It is an eating plan that emphasizes foods that are easy to digest.

Fried and fatty foods, strong cheeses, whole grains (rich in fiber), and the medications aspirin and ibuprofen are avoided while on this diet. Such a diet is called bland because it is soothing to the digestive tract (it minimizes irritation of tissues). It can also be bland in the sense of "lacking flavor", but it does not always have to be so; nonirritating food can be appetizing food, depending on preparation and individual preferences.

Uses

Bland diets are often recommended following stomach or intestinal surgery, or for people with conditions such as ulcers, gastritis, heartburn, nausea, vomiting, diarrhea, gastroenteritis and gas. A bland diet allows the digestive tract to heal before introducing more difficult to digest foods.

Many milk and dairy products may be permissible on a bland diet, but there are a few exceptions. Chocolate-flavored dairy products are discouraged, as well as any strongly spiced cheeses or high fat dairy products such as heavy cream or half-and-half. Mild dairy foods may soothe irritated linings, but excessive fats, cocoa and spices can have the opposite effect.

Most canned fruits and vegetables are fine, with the exception of tomatoes. Tomato-based sauces on pasta are avoided. Bananas are good; however, higher fiber and acidic fruits should be avoided. Baked potatoes and sweet potatoes are very easily digested, but it is important to avoid high fat toppings like butter. Vinegar based foods such as pickles are to be avoided as are sour fermented foods like sauerkraut.

Perhaps, the most difficult adjustment for some to a bland diet may involve meats and proteins. In a strict bland food diet, softer protein sources such as smooth peanut butter, eggs and tofu are encouraged over any type of fibrous or seasoned meat. Certain meats such as poultry or fish are permitted, as long as they are not heavily fried, breaded or processed like sandwich meats. Steamed poultry breast served with a salt substitute would be a typical protein serving while on a bland diet.

A bland diet is designed primarily to help patients recover from gastrointestinal conditions or other medical circumstances in which improved digestion would be essential. It is not especially effective as a long-term weight loss diet, although portion sizes are strictly controlled. Many people find a bland diet to be very difficult to maintain, although some find the use of acceptable spice alternatives does make it easier. Most patients slowly return to a more normal diet once their medical issues have been resolved.

Controversy
Even though milk and other dairy products are permissible in a bland diet, consumption may interfere with the homeostatic processes involved in digestion; prominently for peptic ulcer patients. In an early study, milk was found to have a short-lived gastric acid neutralising effect; which may lead to milk-alkali syndrome and eventually arteriosclerotic heart disease if dietary intake is excessive and uncontrolled. Further research by McArthur, Hogan & Isenberg demonstrated a link between milk consumption and an increase in gastrin production almost equivalent to that of pentagastrin, which may be detrimental to the patients requiring a bland diet as an increased gastric acid output is induced and acts as an overcompensation to the increased (neutralised) pH.

See also
 Compare a BRAT diet

References

Bland diet at Medline Plus
 Low Cholesterol Diet

Diets